The Nigeria Squash Federation was established in 1974 as the governing body that oversees the sport of squash in Nigeria.

References

Nigerian Squash Federation President Visits HS Media, Seeks Cooperation For Squash Revival

Henry Usiayo
https://en.africatopsports.com/2020/09/09/taiwo-hails-fg-for-return-of-sports-after-covid-19/

External links
Official website

Sports governing bodies in Nigeria
National members of the World Squash Federation
Sports organizations established in 1974
Squash in Nigeria
1974 establishments in Nigeria